The silvery grebe (Podiceps occipitalis) is a species of grebe in the family Podicipedidae. Its natural habitat is freshwater lakes but it also feeds in saline lakes.

Description
There are two different subspecies which differ in the colouring on their head and facial plumes. The southern form has a black cap and the sides of its head are grey. The neck, chest and belly are white while the back is dark grey and the sides and flanks blackish. The beak and feet are black and the eye red. It is similar in appearance to the Junin grebe (Podiceps taczanowskii).

Subspecies

P. o. juninensis, (von Berlepsch & Stolzmann, 1894), Colombia to north-west Argentina and northern Chile
P. o. occipitalis, (Garnot, 1826), central & southern Chile & Argentina, Falkland Islands

Distribution and habitat
The silvery grebe nests in Argentina, the Falkland Islands, Chile, and the western parts of Bolivia, Peru, Ecuador and Colombia. It is a migrant in Paraguay and southern Brazil and possibly also in Uruguay. In the Andes it is sometimes found foraging on hypersaline lakes and also inhabits saline lakes in Patagonia where it is found in the company of flamingoes.

Biology
The silvery grebe is found in small groups and feeds on aquatic invertebrates which it catches while diving under the water. Its diet includes adults and larvae of caddisflies, water beetles, chironomid midges and water boatmen.

The silvery grebe tends to breed in colonies on freshwater lakes. The nest is often composed of floating mats of vegetation. Nesting has been recorded in February in Colombia and between September and March in Peru with most eggs being laid between November and January.

Status
The silvery grebe has an extremely wide range and large total population. Although the population trend is downward, the rate of decline is insufficient for the IUCN to rate the bird as "vulnerable" and it is therefore listed as being of "least concern".

References

silvery grebe
Birds of South America
silvery grebe
Taxa named by Prosper Garnot
Taxonomy articles created by Polbot